Ways T'Burn is the fifth album by the Australian indie rock/electronic band Underground Lovers, released in 1997.

Two singles were released from the album—"Starsigns" (June 1997) and "From 'Jumbled in the Common Box'" (November 1997).

Track listing
(All songs by Glenn Bennie and Vincent Giarrusso except where noted)
"All Is Quiet" – 3:04
"Starsigns" – 3:25
"Take a Piece of Cake" – 2:57
"She Thinks Her Revenge" – 4:18
"From 'Jumbled in the Common Box' " (lyrics adapted from poem by W. H. Auden) – 3:10
"Under the Microscope"  – 2:41
"Ways To Burn" – 4:48
"On the Way Home"  – 4:31
"Las Vegas Lullaby" – 2:31
"Excerpt from 'Seven' " (David Chesworth, Robert Goodge) – 0:42
"I Feel So Cold" – 7:35

Personnel
Glenn Bennie –  guitar
Vincent Giarrusso – vocals, keyboards, drums
Maurice Argiro – bass

Additional musicians
Derek J. Yuen — drums ("Take a Piece of Cake", "Las Vegas Lullaby", "I Feel So Cold")
Philippa Nihill — Hammond organ ("She Thinks Her Revenge")
Richard Andrew — drums ("She Thinks Her Revenge")
Tim Howden — violin ("Ways To Burn")
Peter Knight — trumpets ("Las Vegas Lullaby")
Mal Pinkerton — cello ("Las Vegas Lullaby")

References

1997 albums
Underground Lovers albums